Annie Caron (born 6 May 1964) is a Canadian soccer player who played both as a forward and midfielder for the Canada women's national soccer team. She was part of the team at the 1995 FIFA Women's World Cup.

International career
Caron was one of the 23 soccer players that participated in the first-ever Canadian women’s national camp in July 1986 in Winnipeg. She made 34 appearances for Canada and scored 8 goals and assisted 1. Her international debut was on July 7, 1986 against the United States. She earned two silver medals representing Canada at the CONCACAF Women's Championships. (Haiti 1991 and Canada 1994). Caron scored Canada's first hat-trick in a FIFA Women's competition at the 1991 CONCACAF Women's Championship in Port-au-Prince, Haiti.

Honours 
 2021: Canada Soccer Hall of Fame

References

External links
 
 / Canada Soccer Hall of Fame

1964 births
Living people
1995 FIFA Women's World Cup players
Canadian women's soccer players
Canada women's international soccer players
People from Sainte-Foy, Quebec City
Soccer people from Quebec
Sportspeople from Quebec City
Women's association football midfielders